The 2015 ATP Shenzhen Open was a professional men's tennis tournament played on hard courts. It was the second edition of the tournament, and part of the ATP World Tour 250 series of the 2015 ATP World Tour.  It took place at the Shenzhen Longgang Tennis Centre in Shenzhen, China from September 28 to October 4.

Singles main draw entrants

Seeds

 1 Rankings are as of September 21, 2015

Other entrants
The following players received wildcards into the singles main draw:
  Bai Yan
  Wu Di
  Zhang Ze

The following players received entry from the qualifying draw:
  Matthew Ebden
  Hiroki Moriya
  Takuto Niki
  Zhang Zhizhen

Withdrawals
Before the tournament
  Pablo Andújar →replaced by Hyeon Chung
  Borna Ćorić →replaced by Austin Krajicek
  Martin Kližan →replaced by James Duckworth
  Philipp Kohlschreiber →replaced by Go Soeda
  Donald Young →replaced by John Millman
During the tournament
  Adrian Mannarino (Right Hip Impingement)

Retirements
  Victor Estrella Burgos (Upper Back Injury)
 Ernests Gulbis (Right Wrist Injury)

Doubles main draw entrants

Seeds

 1 Rankings are as of September 21, 2015

Other entrants 
The following pairs received wildcards into the doubles main draw:
  Bai Yan /  Wu Di
  Gong Maoxin /  Michael Venus

Champions

Singles

 Tomáš Berdych def.  Guillermo García-López 6-3,7-6(9-7)

Doubles

  Jonathan Erlich /  Colin Fleming def.  Chris Guccione /  André Sá 6-1,6-7(3-7),[10-6]

References

External links
Official site 

ATP Shenzhen Open
ATP Shenzhen Open
ATP Shenzhen Open
ATP Shenzhen Open